is a Japanese actress and singer.

Discography

Single 

 Itsumo kata omoi (いつも片想い)
 Released: 21 March 1983
 Zutto rhapsody (ずっとラプソディ)
 Released: 21 June 1983
 Mizuiro no kachūsha (水色のカチューシャ)
 Released: 21 September 1983
 LOVE WITH YOU 
 Released: 21 January 1984
used as opening song of the anime Katri, Girl of the Meadows
 Chiguhagu KISS (ちぐはぐキッス)
 Released: 21 May 1984
 Ojisan no kimochi mo shiranaide (おじさんの気持も知らないで)
 Released: 21 September 1984
 Hotel Osaka (ホテルOSAKA)
 Released: 21 May 1985
 Kimagure MY LOVE (気まぐれマイ・ラブ)　
 Released: 21 July 1986
 Tsuyogari (つよがり)
 Released: 5 October 1988
 STORY
 Released: 21 June 1991
 Koi ni odoreba (恋に踊れば)
 Released: 17 March 1995

Albums 

 Namida STAR Girls
 Released: 21 October 1983
 Best of Chie Kobayashi
 Released: 19 June 2002
 Namida STAR Girls (CD)
 Released: 16 July 2008

References

External links 
 

1963 births
Anime musicians
Japanese actresses
Japanese women pop singers
Living people
Musicians from Osaka Prefecture
People from Toyonaka, Osaka
20th-century Japanese women singers
20th-century Japanese singers
21st-century Japanese women singers
21st-century Japanese singers